The Egyptian hieroglyph representing a honey bee (𓆤 Gardiner L2). It is used as an ideogram for "bee" (bjt),
but most frequently as part of the title of the King of Upper and Lower Egypt, rendered nswt-bjtj (interpreted as "He of the Sedge and the Bee").

See also

Gardiner's Sign List#L. Invertebrates and lesser animals
 Egyptian biliteral signs
 Nswt-bjtj
List of Egyptian hieroglyphs

References

Betrò, 1995. Hieroglyphics: The Writings of Ancient Egypt, Betrò, Maria Carmela, c. 1995, 1996-(English), Abbeville Press Publishers, New York, London, Paris (hardcover)
Budge, (1920), 1978.  An Egyptian Hieroglyphic Dictionary, E.A.Wallace Budge, (Dover Publications), c 1978, (c 1920), Dover edition, 1978. (In two volumes, 1314 pp. and cliv-(154) pp.) (softcover)

Egyptian hieroglyphs: invertebrates and lesser animals